Chu Guiting (26 July 189216 February 1977) was a prolific martial artist who studied under the famous local masters, Jiang Yuhe, Yu Bingzhong, and Chen Delu, and went on to influence many different Chinese martial arts schools through his teaching.

In 1912, Chu Guiting began to study Xingyiquan (Shape and Mind Boxing) and Baguazhang (Eight Trigram Boxing) under Grandmaster Li Cunyi, who recognized him as his official disciple. At the age of twenty, Chu Guiting left his hometown and traveled extensively throughout China, visiting Beijing and Tianjin, Liaoning in the north, and Wuhan, Changsha, and Nanchang in the south.

In 1921, Chu Guiting studied Yang-shi taijiquan (Yang Style Grand Ultimate Fist) in Hangzhou under Yang Chengfu – a direct descendant of the style's progenitor, Yang Luchan. In doing so, he became one of the "Five Tiger Generals".

Between 1916 and 1940, Chu Guiting was heavily involved in martial arts in both Jiangsu and Shanghai. During this time he worked with the East China Five Province General's Bodyguards, the Central Chinese Boxing Association, the Zhejiang Province Chinese Boxing Association, the Central Police Officers Association, the Presidential Palace Bodyguards, the National Government's Military Department, and the Jiangsu Public Security Headquarters. He also taught Chinese martial arts privately.

In 1928, General Li, General Zhang Zi Jiang, and General Fung Zu Ziang held the first full-contact national competition in Nanjing, China.  The purpose was to find the best candidates for teaching positions at the government-sponsored Central Martial Arts Academy.  Hundreds of the best Chinese martial artists participated in sanda, weapons, and shuai jiao.  After several days, the fighting competitions were halted because too many competitors were seriously injured.  Two died.  Since the fights were stopped prematurely, 12 martial artists have historically been remembered as "the champion".  Chu Guiting was one of them.

During the 1950s, Chu Guiting settled in Shanghai and began to teach classes in Waitan Park, Fuxing Park, and the Peoples’ Park. He also taught classes for a wide range of companies including the Bank of China, the Communications Bank, the Government's Public Security Department, the Shanghai Electric Cable Factory, the Poplar Tree Beach Power Plant, and the Eternal Peace Company.

In 1958, Chu Guiting was invited to become the Chinese National Martial Arts Committee's Assistant Director. Following this, he was invited with Wang Ziping and Lu Zhenduo to choreograph a sword dance for the Shanghai Song and Dance Institution, which won a silver medal at the World Youth Festival.

In 1956, Chu Guiting, Cai Longyun, Fu Zhongwen, and Zhang Yu were commissioned by the Shanghai branch of the Chinese Education Union to condense and simplify Yang-shi taijiquan (Yang Style Grand Ultimate Fist) into a general system that could be conveniently studied by the masses. Shortly afterwards, Chu Guiting, Gu Liuxin, and Fu Zhongwen were invited to Beijing to formulate the famous Simplified 24 and 28 Step Yang-shi taijiquan (Yang Style Grand Ultimate Fist), forms that are still practiced throughout China today.

Chu Guiting was a renowned teacher. It was his belief that in order to learn martial arts one must harmonize the body, the breath, and the mind.  Many Chinese martial artists trace their lineage back to Chu Guiting, and he taught artists from other styles.  For example, he taught Xingyiquan, Baguazhang, and Taijiquan to Chan Yik Yan.

In teaching, Chu Guiting paid particular attention to the moral philosophy of Chinese martial arts, and would often say: "With morals much can be achieved, without them nothing can be achieved. Consider, for example, somebody who studies a martial art but does not recognize its moral and philosophical depth. They will soon give it up because they have only ever tasted the skin of the grape and not the fruit that it contains."

Chu Guiting died on 16 February 1977.

References

External links
 Chu Guiting Internal Martial Arts: a website dedicated to Chu Guiting (English version)

1892 births
1977 deaths
People from Cangzhou
Chinese baguazhang practitioners
Chinese xingyiquan practitioners
Chinese tai chi practitioners
Sportspeople from Hebei